The 1940 Football League War Cup Final was contested by West Ham United and Blackburn Rovers.

Route to the final
En route to the final West Ham played Chelsea, Leicester City, Huddersfield Town and Birmingham City before a semi-final with Fulham which they won 4-3.

Match 
It was played on 8 June 1940 and kicked off at 6.30pm despite fears that London would be bombed by the Luftwaffe.  The wartime crowd included wounded members of the BEF recently evacuated from Dunkirk.  West Ham won the tie 1–0; the only goal coming from Sam Small in the 34th minute when he followed up a parried shot from George Foreman.

Match details

Post Match
The trophy was presented to the winning team by A. V. Alexander, First Lord of the Admiralty.

As the match was played during wartime, no reception was held for the winning team. Some players went to the Boleyn public house on Green Street for a few pints whilst others returned immediately to their service units.

References

Football League War Cup
War Cup Final 1940
War Cup Final 1940
Football League War Cup Final
Cup